Pragnay Reddy (born 18 December 1999) is an Indian cricketer. He made his Twenty20 debut on 12 January 2021, for Hyderabad in the 2020–21 Syed Mushtaq Ali Trophy.

References

External links
 

1999 births
Living people
Indian cricketers
Hyderabad cricketers
Place of birth missing (living people)